Eric Michael Wedge (born January 27, 1968) is an American former baseball Major League Baseball (MLB) catcher and manager.

As a player, Wedge attended Northrop High School in Fort Wayne and played on the school's state champion baseball team in 1983. He went on to attend Wichita State, and played on the Shockers team that won the 1989 College World Series. From 1989–1997 he played in the minor league systems of the Boston Red Sox, Colorado Rockies, Detroit Tigers, and Philadelphia Phillies, and played in 39 major league games with the Red Sox and Rockies between 1991 and 1994.

Wedge managed in the Cleveland Indians minor league system from 1998–2002 before being named manager of the Indians for the 2003 season. He led the Indians to a postseason berth in 2007, and won the American League Manager of the Year Award that year. He managed the Indians through the 2009 season. He then managed the Seattle Mariners from 2011 to 2013, and then worked as player development advisor for the Toronto Blue Jays from 2016 to 2019. Wedge returned to manage the Wichita State Shockers from 2020 to 2022.

Collegiate playing career
Wedge played catcher and Center for Wichita State University from 1987–1989, leading the school to a 68–16 record and the College World Series championship in 1989. He hit .380 for the Shockers that year, led the NCAA in walks and total bases and finished second in runs, RBI, and home runs. Wedge's performance earned him first-team All-America honors,
the Missouri Valley Conference Player of the Year award
and he was runner-up to Ben McDonald for the Rotary Smith Award for College Baseball Player of the Year.

In 1988, he played collegiate summer baseball in the Cape Cod Baseball League (CCBL) for the Yarmouth-Dennis Red Sox, where he was named to the all-league team. In 2011, he was inducted into the CCBL Hall of Fame.

Professional playing career
The Boston Red Sox selected Wedge in the third round of the 1989 Major League Baseball draft. While in the Red Sox major league system, he played for the Elmira Pioneers (1989), New Britain Red Sox (1989–1991), Winter Haven Red Sox (1991) and Pawtucket Red Sox (1991–1992, 1994–1995). On October 5, 1991, he made his major league debut in his only appearance of the season for Boston with a pinch hit single off Chris George of the Milwaukee Brewers.
In 1992, he appeared in 27 games for Boston (20 as a designated hitter, 5 as a catcher and 2 as a pinch hitter), hitting .250.

In November 1992, the Colorado Rockies selected Wedge from the Red Sox in the 1992 Major League Baseball expansion draft. He played for the Central Valley Rockies and Colorado Springs Sky Sox in 1993 and was a September call-up for Colorado that season, appearing in 9 games (8 as a pinch hitter and 1 as a catcher) and hitting .182 with 1 RBI.

The Rockies released Wedge at the end of spring training in 1994 and he was re-signed by the Red Sox on May 2.
He split catching duties with Scott Hatteberg for Pawtucket that season and made his final big league appearances with Boston in July, going 0-for-6 in two games as a designated hitter. He returned to Pawtucket for the 1995 season and again split catching duties with Hatteberg.

Wedge played his final two seasons with the Toledo Mud Hens in the Detroit Tigers organization and the Scranton/Wilkes-Barre Red Barons in the Philadelphia Phillies organization in 1996 and 1997, respectively.

Managerial career

Minor leagues
Wedge made his managerial debut in 1998 with the Columbus RedStixx of the South Atlantic League, leading the Cleveland single-A affiliate to an overall record of 59–81. In 1999, he was the manager of Cleveland's Carolina League affiliate in Kinston. His team took first place during the first half of the season with a 37–32 record and second place during the second half with a 42–26 record. After the season, he was named the Carolina League Manager of the Year.

The Indians promoted Wedge to manager of the double-A Akron Aeros in 2000. The Aeros finished the season 75–68, just missing the Eastern League post-season after losing a one-game playoff with Harrisburg. In 2001, he continued his ascent through the Indians' managerial ranks, leading their triple-A affiliate, Buffalo Bisons, to a 91–51 first-place finish in the International League's North Division and a berth in the post-season where they lost to Scranton-Wilkes Barre in the semi-finals. Wedge again earned post-season honors when he was named the International League Manager of the Year and Baseball America's Triple A Manager of the Year. He returned at the helm of the Bisons in 2002 and again led them to the post-season, finishing 87–57 and second in the North Division. This time, they defeated Scranton in the semi-finals but were swept by the Durham Bulls in the finals. Wedge was honored with his third post-season award when The Sporting News named him Minor League Manager of the Year.

Cleveland Indians
On October 29, 2002, Wedge was named the 39th manager of the Cleveland Indians. Over his first three years as manager, the Indians improved steadily from fourth place in the American League Central Division with a 68–94 record in 2003, to 80–82 and third place in 2004 and to 93–69 and second place in 2005. The 93 wins in 2005 were the eighth most in the more than hundred-year history of the franchise and the team narrowly missed qualifying for the playoffs for the first time since 2001 when they were eliminated on the last day of the season. In the American League Manager of the Year balloting for 2005, Wedge finished as runner-up to Ozzie Guillén.

The 2006 season was a disappointing one for Wedge and the Indians. Entering the season, they were expected to compete for the division title, but got off to a poor start and were essentially out of the race by mid-season, trailing the division-leading Detroit Tigers at the All-Star break by  games. They finished the season in fourth place with a 78–84 record, 18 games behind the Central Division champion, Minnesota Twins.

Wedge and the Indians had more success in the 2007 season going 96–66 and winning the Central Division title for the first time since 2001. Wedge then led the Indians to beat the Yankees in four games to win the Division Series, and moved on to play the Boston Red Sox in the Championship Series, where they lost in seven games after losing three straight games when leading the series 3-1. Wedge received The Sporting News Manager of the Year Award and the MLB Manager of the Year Award for the American League in 2007. The following year the Indians would go 81-81, finishing third in the Central. The club, which was just four wins shy from winning 100 games in 2007, fell to the other end of the spectrum in 2009, finishing three losses from the century mark at 65-97 and further down in the Central standings at fourth.

On September 30, 2009, the Cleveland Indians announced that Wedge would not be retained as manager after the season ended.

Seattle Mariners
On October 18, 2010, Wedge was named the Mariners manager, and agreed to a three-year contract. In 2011, the team finished 67–95, in last place in the AL West Division, 29 games out of first place.  The following year he led the team to a 75—87 finish, another last place finish. Wedge suffered a stroke in July 2013 and missed 28 games. On September 27, 2013, Wedge announced he would not return as the Mariners manager for the 2014 season, declining their contract offer for a one–year contract extension.

Toronto Blue Jays
On February 6, 2016, Wedge was hired as a player development advisor by the Toronto Blue Jays.  He interviewed for the vacant New York Yankees managerial position in November 2017.

Wichita State Shockers
On May 29, 2019, Wedge was named head baseball coach of the Wichita State Shockers. On December 8, 2022, the school announced he would not return as coach.

Major League managerial record

Collegiate coaching record

Broadcasting career
Wedge joined Baseball Tonight on ESPN as a Studio Analyst for the 2014 and 2015 seasons alongside Ozzie Guillén and Dallas Braden. Wedge's analysis was featured in a segment called "Cutting The Wedge."

Personal life
2018 marked Wedge's fourteenth year hosting a baseball camp organized by World Baseball Academy and sponsored by Automotive Color &
Supply Corp at The ASH Centre in Fort Wayne, IN. Also in January 2007, he was inducted into the Indiana High School Baseball Hall of Fame
and in February 2007, he was inducted into the Kinston Professional Baseball Hall of Fame.
In total, Wedge has been inducted to 16 Hall of Fames. 

Wedge and ex-wife Kate have a daughter and a son. Wedge resides in Wichita, KS.

References

External links

MLB.com bio page 

1968 births
Living people
Sportspeople from Fort Wayne, Indiana
Cleveland Indians managers
Seattle Mariners managers
Boston Red Sox players
Colorado Rockies players
Pawtucket Red Sox players
Toledo Mud Hens players
Winter Haven Red Sox players
Baseball players from Fort Wayne, Indiana
Minor league baseball managers
Manager of the Year Award winners
Buffalo Bisons (minor league) managers
Yarmouth–Dennis Red Sox players
Wichita State Shockers baseball players
All-American college baseball players
Wichita State Shockers baseball coaches
Central Valley Rockies players
Colorado Springs Sky Sox players
Elmira Pioneers players
New Britain Red Sox players
Scranton/Wilkes-Barre Red Barons players